The Reunion is the 30th book in the Animorphs series, authored by K.A. Applegate. It is known to have been ghostwritten by Elise Donner. It is narrated by Marco.

Plot summary

Enjoying a day to skip school, Marco unexpectedly runs into his mother (Visser One), and discovers she is hiding in an office building, planning to find the Hork-Bajir colony. Marco, Tobias and Ax confirm this on a late-night visit, in which they negotiate a deal with Visser One. Marco begins to formulate a plan that will destroy Vissers One and Three, and free his mother, and make the Yeerks believe they have destroyed the Hork-Bajir colony. The plan goes well for the most part, but a few miscalculations reveal to Visser One that at least one of the guerrilla fighters is human and there is a misconception that Jake and Cassie have died. When the Animorphs spring the battle between the two Vissers, Visser Three is forced to retreat and Visser One is believed to have perished (over a cliff, butted by Marco in mountain goat morph), though not before realizing that Marco is one of the warriors.

Morphs

1999 science fiction novels
Animorphs books
1999 American novels